Iver Elieson (3 November 1683 – 4 November 1753) was a Norwegian  businessman, land owner and timber merchant. 

Elieson was born at Drammen in Buskerud, Norway. His father, Elias Nielssøn (1654-1699), was a  merchant in Bragernes. Dating from the 1720s,  Elieson started buying forests and farms in Akershus. Eventually he developed into a large sawmill owner and timber exporter. He also owned a paper mill by the Akerselva. He had success with his timber trade and was among the wealthiest persons in Christiania (now Oslo).

Personal life
He was married to Karen Mortensdatter Leuch (1694–1765).  They couple had ten children. Their son, Morten Leuch Elieson (1724-1763) owned  Hafslund Manor in Sarpsborg. Their daughter, Karen Elieson (1723-1806), was married to Christian Ancher who owned Paléet Manor  near Bjørvika.

References

1683 births
1753 deaths
People from Drammen
Norwegian merchants
18th-century Norwegian businesspeople
Norwegian landowners